Meherbaan (English: Kind) (Urdu: مہربان) is a 2017 Pakistani drama serial which is aired on A Plus Entertainment.

Plot
It is a story of two sisters Dua (Nimra Khan) and Mehru (Ammara Butt) with contrasting personalities. While Dua is the humble and down-to-earth daughter, Mehru is arrogant and snobbish. She does not care about her house's humble condition. All she cares about is her beauty and her friends. She works at an office and does not care about her household responsibilities. The first issue their mother is having is regarding her daughters’ marriage proposals. Whenever someone comes to see Dua for marriage, they like the young and chirpy Mehru instead. The life is not as easy as it may seem for both girls in a relatively conservative household.

Cast
 Nimra Khan as Dua 
 Ammara Butt as Mehru 
 Affan Waheed as Daaniyal
 Irfan Khoosat as Haji's: Dua and Mehru Father
 Asad Malik as Shah Nawaz
 Munazzah Arif as Ismat
 Raheela Agha as Nasreen: Haji's wife
 Jazib Akram as Asad

References

External links
 Meherbaan on A-plus.tv

2017 Pakistani television series debuts
2017 Pakistani television series endings
A-Plus TV original programming
Pakistani drama television series
Urdu-language television shows